Annaberg is a former sugar factory and plantation on the island of Saint John in the United States Virgin Islands. It is uninhabited and part of the Annaberg Historic District within the Virgin Islands National Park.

References

Populated places in Saint John, U.S. Virgin Islands